Kathrin Klaas (born 6 February 1984 in Haiger, Hesse) is a female hammer thrower from Germany. She is member of the Eintracht Frankfurt athletes team.

Her personal best throw is 76.05 metres, set at the 2012 Summer Olympics.

Achievements

References

External links 

1984 births
Living people
People from Lahn-Dill-Kreis
Sportspeople from Giessen (region)
German female hammer throwers
Athletes (track and field) at the 2008 Summer Olympics
Athletes (track and field) at the 2012 Summer Olympics
Athletes (track and field) at the 2016 Summer Olympics
Olympic athletes of Germany
Eintracht Frankfurt athletes
World Athletics Championships athletes for Germany
Universiade medalists in athletics (track and field)
Universiade bronze medalists for Germany
Medalists at the 2009 Summer Universiade
20th-century German women
21st-century German women